Condor Peninsula is a mountainous, ice-covered peninsula,  long and  wide, between Odom Inlet and Hilton Inlet on the east coast of Palmer Land. The peninsula was first observed and photographed from the air in the course of the United States Antarctic Service (USAS) "Condor" flight of December 30, 1940 from the East Base with Black, Snow, Perce, Carroll and Dyer aboard. It was named by the Advisory Committee on Antarctic Names after the twin-motored Curtiss-Wright Condor biplane in which personnel of USAS, 1939–41, made numerous photographic flights and flights of discovery over the Antarctic Peninsula, George VI Sound, Alexander Island, Charcot Island and the Bellingshausen Sea between latitudes 67°30′S and 74°0′S. The peninsula was mapped in detail by the United States Geological Survey in 1974.

Features 
 Angle Peak
 Cadle Monolith
 Mount Showers

References 

Peninsulas of Palmer Land